Janet Green may refer to:
 Janet Green (screenwriter), British screenwriter and playwright
 Janet-Laine Green, Canadian actress
 Janet Wolfson de Botton, British art collector and bridge player
 Janet Green, one of the pseudonymns of Mary Millington
 Janet Green (All My Children), soap opera character